The Alstom Citadis Spirit is a low-floor articulated light rail vehicle developed by Alstom for Ottawa's O-Train. It is marketed as part of its Citadis family, which includes other models of light rail vehicles, and is based on the Citadis Dualis. 

The Citadis Spirit is designed for both city-centre and suburban operation. Its low-floor design has no interior steps or ramps.

The first order for the Citadis Spirit came from the City of Ottawa for use on the new Confederation Line opened in September 2019. The second order came from the Government of Ontario's Metrolinx transit agency. They have placed an order to serve future light rail lines in the Greater Toronto Area.

Options
The Citadis Spirit is constructed using four types of modules, not all of which are used on the same vehicle: 

Promotional videos illustrate four configurations for the Citadis Spirit, while the vendor brochure illustrates only three. The following table combines data from the two sources:

Promotional videos suggest that a customer can purchase a shorter vehicle and extend it later by adding modules. However, as illustrated in videos, if the C+S+C version were purchased, the short-centre (S) module would need to be replaced by the long-centre (L) module. The vehicle must have one centre module, either short or long, as only these carry the pantograph.

Power options in addition to pantograph pickup include:
APS technology: Power supplied from a conductor built into the ground with the same performance as with pantograph electrical pickup.
Batteries: On-board energy storage batteries for medium to long-range, off-wire travel.
Super-capacitors: On-board energy storage devices for short-distance use requiring in-station recharging.

Manufacturing
Manufacturing for the Citadis Spirit takes place in several locations. Major parts manufacturing occurs in Hornell, New York, bogies are manufactured in Sorel-Tracy, Quebec, and final assembly takes place in Ottawa, Ontario. A second final assembly plant has since been established in Brampton, Ontario.

Orders

City of Ottawa

Alstom supplied 34 Citadis Spirit vehicles for the City of Ottawa's Confederation Line which opened on September 14, 2019. Alstom will also provide maintenance services for 30 years to Rideau Transit Group (RTG), the consortium responsible for the design, construction, financing, and maintenance of the line. The trains were built in Hornell, New York and Sorel-Tracy, Quebec, with final assembly in Ottawa. The Ottawa vehicles have 27 percent Canadian content.

The vehicles consist of four modules: two cab modules each with two doors per side, a centre module with 1 door on each side and an intermediate module with 2 doors on each side. The vehicle is configured for 300 passengers.

In June 2017, it was announced that Alstom had been awarded the contract to provide vehicles for Phase 2 of the Confederation Line. The order was placed for 38 additional Citadis Spirit vehicles, bringing the total amount of Spirit vehicles on Confederation line to 72.

Vehicle issues
By early October 2019, the automated doors of the vehicles used by Ottawa's Confederation Line experienced faults if pried open or held back by passengers; this resulted in numerous service disruptions, some lasting up to 90 minutes due to a lack of proper procedures to isolate and disable the faulty doors while a train was in service. The vehicles also began encountering integration issues with Thales' SelTrac train control system that led to the on-board computer for some trains in service needing to be rebooted, causing delays of up to 20 to 30 minutes.

Reliability gradually improved in November and December 2019. However, on December 31, 2019, electrical problems caused by improperly cleaned electrical contacts on the roof of the trains caused disruptions to passengers. Then, throughout January 2020, service continued to suffer due to a combination of train and track switch failures. The trains' interior heating systems have been reported to be insufficient in Ottawa's sub-zero winter temperatures, forcing OC Transpo to consider adding heaters to the vehicles. A manufacturing defect with the inductors used by the vehicles led to numerous electrical failures in inclement weather. On January 30, 2020, the Confederation Line reached an all-time operational low when it was short five trains due to "recurring mechanical and electrical issues". Only eight to nine trains ran during the day. The Confederation Line is expected to field 13 working trains during rush hour.

On July 2, 2020, cracks were found on two wheels of a vehicle during routine maintenance activities. A subsequent inspection of all vehicles found two more wheels with cracks, for a total of four across three different vehicles. As a result, half of the fleet is currently kept out of service each day so that every wheel on each vehicle can be inspected before the vehicle can be put back into service. On July 10, 2020, the Transportation Safety Board of Canada (TSB) launched an independent investigation into the matter. On September 16, 2020, the City announced that Alstom had determined that the root cause of the issue was an improperly aligned screw that caused stress on the wheel, resulting in the cracks. Alstom said it would replace every wheel in the fleet by early 2021. The TSB's independent investigation continued at that time. As of August 3, 2021, the wheels on 32 vehicles had been replaced.

On August 8, 2021, an out-of-service train partially derailed when a single wheel came off of the tracks after crossing a switch. All vehicles were pulled from service the following day pending a root-cause investigation. The TSB, again, deployed investigators to assess the incident; it did not, however, launch a formal investigation. The initial findings by RTG suggested that a fault within the axle–bearing assembly was potentially the cause of the derailment.

Metrolinx

Metrolinx, a provincial transit agency within the province of Ontario, has placed an order for 61 Citadis Spirit vehicles to serve future light rail lines in the Greater Toronto Area. Metrolinx intends to assign 17 vehicles from the order to serve the planned Finch West LRT in Toronto while the remaining 44 vehicles will go to the planned Hurontario LRT in Mississauga. Both lines are under construction. To fill the Metrolinx order, Alstom has set up a plant in Brampton, Ontario, that will create 100 to 120 full-time direct jobs. In September 2020, the Brampton plant was assembling its first Citadis, which was delivered to the Finch West LRT maintenance and storage facility in late July 2021.

The Metrolinx website described the passenger capacity of the  vehicle ordered as 120 seated and 216 standing. The vehicle will have space for wheelchairs, strollers and (outside of peak hours) bicycles. (The vendor brochure gives a maximum capacity of 340 passengers for that length of vehicle.)

Metrolinx placed the Citadis Spirit order mainly because it was concerned that Bombardier might not be able deliver an order of Flexity Freedom vehicles in time to open Line 5 Eglinton, a light rail line under construction in Toronto. If Bombardier failed to deliver, Metrolinx would be liable for heavy penalties of $500,000 per day payable to the consortium building that line. Thus, the Citadis Spirit order acted as insurance in case Bombardier fails to complete the Flexity Freedom order on time. If Bombardier is late, then the 44 vehicles for the Hurontario LRT could completely service Line 5 Eglinton.

References

External links

 Published by Alstom on May 12, 2017, promoting the vehicle for mixed traffic service as well as for reserved lanes.
 Published by OCTranspo on April 30, 2014, illustrating technical details.

Toronto rapid transit passenger equipment
Proposed public transport in the Greater Toronto Area
Articulated passenger trains
Metrolinx
Alstom trams
Tram vehicles of Canada
Electric multiple units of Canada
750 V DC multiple units
1500 V DC multiple units